György Mészáros (April 30, 1933 – September 14, 2015) was a Hungarian sprint canoeist who competed from the mid-1950s to the early 1970s. Competing in two Summer Olympics, he won two silver medals at Rome in 1960, earning them in the K-1 4 × 500 m and the K-2 1000 m events.

Mészáros also won five medals at the ICF Canoe Sprint World Championships with a gold (K-2 1000 m: 1954), three silvers (K-1 4 × 500 m: 1958, K-4 1000 m: 1958, K-4 10000 m: 1971), and a bronze (K-4 10000 m: 1954).

His daughter Erika won two Olympic canoeing medals of her own in the women's K-4 500 m event with a gold in 1992 and a silver in 1988.

References

Sources

Wallechinsky, David and Jaime Loucky (2008). "Canoeing: Women's Kayak Fours 500 Meters". In The Complete Book of the Olympics: 2008 Edition. London: Aurum Press. p. 495.

External links
 
 
 
 

1933 births
Canoeists at the 1960 Summer Olympics
Canoeists at the 1964 Summer Olympics
Hungarian male canoeists
2015 deaths
Olympic canoeists of Hungary
Olympic silver medalists for Hungary
Olympic medalists in canoeing
ICF Canoe Sprint World Championships medalists in kayak
Medalists at the 1960 Summer Olympics
Canoeists from Budapest